James "Jim" Stewart McIntosh (August 9, 1930 – February 24, 2018) was an American rower who won the silver medal in the 1956 Summer Olympics in coxless fours. He was born in Detroit, Michigan.

References 

James McIntosh's obituary

1930 births
2018 deaths
Rowers at the 1956 Summer Olympics
Olympic silver medalists for the United States in rowing
American male rowers
Medalists at the 1956 Summer Olympics
Pan American Games medalists in rowing
Pan American Games bronze medalists for the United States
Rowers at the 1959 Pan American Games
Rowers from Detroit